Bernard Gilpin (1517 – 4 March 1583), was an Oxford theologian and then an influential clergyman in the emerging Church of England spanning the reigns of Henry VIII, Edward VI, Jane, Mary and Elizabeth I.  He was known as the 'Apostle of the North' for his work in the wilds of northern England.

Biography

Gilpin family 

Bernard Gilpin descended from a Westmorland family with a pedigree back to Richard de Gylpyn in about 1206. He was born at Kentmere Hall, the son of Edwin and Margaret (née Layton), and grew up in the Kentmere valley; the parish church of St Cuthbert is today little changed from mid seventeenth century drawings, and its churchyard contains a yew tree known to Gilpin, being certified over 1,000 years old. George Gilpin was his elder brother. Margaret's uncle was Cuthbert Tunstall, Bishop of London and then of Durham, and Executor of Henry VIII's Estate.
He is recorded to have entered Lancaster Royal Grammar School in the 1530s.

Oxford 
He entered The Queen's College, Oxford in 1533, graduating Bachelor of Arts (B.A.) in 1540, Master of Arts (M.A.) in 1542 and Bachelor of Divinity (B.D.) in 1549. He was elected fellow of Queen's and ordained in 1542; subsequently he was elected Student of Christ Church. He was a diligent student of the writings of Erasmus.

Marian Persecutions 
However, at Oxford he first adhered to the conservative side, and defended the doctrines of the church against the victims of the Marian Persecutions, and in particular John Hooper, one of the first four Marian Martyrs.

Transubstantiation Debate 
Peter Martyr, Pietro Martire Vermigli, a leading Italian Reformer, was appointed to the chair of Divinity of Oxford. In the course of his Lectures on 1st Corinthians he attacked the "Romish doctrine" of transubstantiation. In the subsequent debate opponents of Peter Martyr's view included Bernard Gilpin, along with Doctors Tresham, Chedsey and Morgan.

Vicar of Norton 
In November 1552 he was presented to the vicarage of Norton, in the diocese of Durham. Persons appointed to livings in Royal patronage at that time were required to preach before the King, that there might be an opportunity of ascertaining their orthodoxy. Accordingly, on the first Sunday after Epiphany 1553 Gilpin went to Greenwich to preach in the Royal presence. His sermon on sacrilege is extant and displays the high ideal he had formed of the clerical office.

General Licence to Preach 
As a result of his sermon at Greenwich Gilpin obtained a licence, through William Cecil, as a general preacher throughout the kingdom as long as the King lived. This was one of only twenty-two or twenty-three granted during the reign of Edward VI. His contemporary John Knox, later a Presbyterian, was another. He was also a clergyman in the Diocese of Durham, at Berwick-upon-Tweed and Newcastle, between 1549 and 1554.

Foreign theological pursuits 
On Mary's accession in 1553 he went abroad to pursue his theological investigations at Leuven, Antwerp and Paris; and from a letter dated 1554, we get a glimpse of the quiet student rejoicing in an "excellent library belonging to a monastery of Minorites."

Archdeacon of Durham 
Returning to England towards the close of Queen Mary's reign, he was invested in 1556 by his mother's uncle, Cuthbert Tunstall, bishop of Durham, with the archdeaconry of Durham, to which the rectory of Easington was annexed.

Rector of Houghton-le-Spring 
The freedom of his attacks on the vices, and especially the clerical vices, of his times excited hostility against him, and he was formally brought before the bishop on a charge consisting of thirteen articles. Tunstall, however, in 1557 not only dismissed the case, but presented the offender with the rich living of Houghton-le-Spring; and when the accusation was again brought forward, he again protected him.

Royal Warrant for Apprehension 
Enraged at this defeat, Gilpin's enemies laid their complaint before Edmund Bonner, bishop of London, who secured a royal warrant for his apprehension. Upon this Gilpin prepared for martyrdom; and, having ordered his house-steward to provide him with a long garment, that he might go the more comely to the stake, he set out for London. Fortunately, however, for him, he broke his leg on the journey, and his arrival was thus delayed till the news of Queen Mary's death freed him from further danger.

He at once returned to Houghton-le-Spring, and there he continued to labour.

See of Carlisle and Provostship of Queen's 
When the Roman Catholic bishop was deprived in 1560, Gilpin was offered the see of Carlisle, but he declined this honour. He also declined the provostship of Queen's College, Oxford, which was offered him in 1561.

Hospitality 
At Houghton his course of life was a ceaseless round of benevolent activity. In June 1560 he entertained Cecil and Dr Nicholas Wotton on their way to Edinburgh. His hospitable manner of living was the admiration of all. His living was a comparatively rich one, his house was better than many bishops palaces, and his position was that of a clerical magnate. In his household he spent every fortnight forty bushels of corn, twenty bushels of malt and an ox, besides a proportional quantity of other kinds of provisions. Strangers and travellers found a ready reception; and even their horses were treated with so much care that it was humorously said that, if one were turned loose in any part of the country, it would immediately make its way to the rector of Houghton.

Every Sunday from Michaelmas till Easter was a public day with Gilpin. For the reception of his parishioners he had three tables well covered, one for gentlemen, the second for husbandmen, the third for day-laborers; and this piece of hospitality he never omitted, even when losses or scarcity made its continuance difficult.

Grammar School 
He built and endowed a grammar-school at a cost of upwards of £500, educated and maintained a large number of poor children at his own charge, and provided the more promising pupils with means of studying at the universities. So many young people flocked to his school that there was not accommodation for them in Houghton, and he had to fit up part of his house as a boarding establishment. The school continues today in the form of Kepier School.

Visiting Neglected Parts of North of England 
Grieved at the ignorance and superstition which the remissness of the clergy permitted to flourish in the neighbouring parishes, he used every year to visit the most neglected parts of Northumberland, Yorkshire, Cheshire, Westmorland and Cumberland; and that his own flock might not suffer, he was at the expense of a constant assistant. Among his parishioners he was looked up to as a judge, and did great service in preventing lawsuits amongst them. If an industrious man suffered a loss, he delighted to make it good; if the harvest was bad, he was liberal in the remission of tithes.

Glove above Church Door 
The boldness which he could display at need is well illustrated by his action in regard to duelling. Finding one day a challenge-glove stuck up on the door of a church where he was to preach, he took it down with his own hand, and proceeded to the pulpit to inveigh against the unchristian custom. This is how Sir Walter Scott describes it in his preface letter to The Death of the Laird's Jock in August 1831. Bernard Gilpin, the apostle of the north, the first who undertook to preach the Protestant doctrines to the Border dalesmen, was surprised, on entering one of their churches, to see a gauntlet or mail-glove hanging above the altar.  Upon enquiring the meaning of a symbol so indecorous being displayed in that sacred place, he was informed by the clerk that the glove was that of a famous swordsman, who hung it there as an emblem of a general challenge and gage of battle, to any who should dare to take the fatal token down.   Reach it to me, said the reverend churchman.  The clerk and sexton equally declined the perilous office, and the good Bernard Gilpin was obliged to remove the glove with his own hands, desiring those who were present to inform the champion that he, and no other, had possessed himself of the gage of defiance.  But the champion was as much ashamed to face Bernard Gilpin as the officials of the church had been to displace his pledge of combat.

Gladstone's Tribute 
His theological position was not in accord with any of the religious parties of his age. William Ewart Gladstone thought that the catholicity of the Anglican Church was better exemplified in his career than in those of more prominent ecclesiastics. In a letter addressed to me in 1888, Mr. Gladstone, whom I had asked in what sense he understood the existence of a spiritual continuity between the ancient Catholic Church and the existing Church of England, replied, In the Elizabethan interval, and before Anglicanism had a recognised existence as a form of thought, I should look for the spiritual continuity in men like Bernard Gilpin, as, before the Reformation, mainly in men like Colet. Although this hardly involves continuity in the sense in which the question was asked, the conjunction of these two names strikes me as particularly happy : for, while both of them were Catholic priests by ordination, neither of them could he described as Roman in their sympathies; indeed, it would be truer to say of both that their tone of mind, as ecclesiastics and as educationists, was more what would now he reckoned as Anglican.

And the name of Bernard Gilpin suggests the lines on which a true, popular history of the Reformation might be written. Born in 1517 and dying in 1583, ordained in the reign of Henry VIII, selected to preach before Edward VI, presented to an important benefice in the north of England in the reign of Mary, and holding it until his death, he might seem an obvious butt for satire on the laxity of conscience in those who conformed throughout the Reformation period. But a study of his life would tell a very different tale, and show a man of deep Christian convictions and unimpeachable honesty, deservedly held in honour, not only by the conforming priests of whom he was one, and who formed of course the great majority of the clergy of the Church of England during the early years of Elizabeth's reign, but also by the new men, ordained under the new regime.

An historical romance, based on the life of Bernard Gilpin, concerning whom a good deal is known, and illustrated, by a competent historical scholar, with accurately stated incidents, in which the religious life of the Reformation period should be depicted, as graphically as Newman in Callista, or Pater in Marius the Epicurean, deincted the growth of Christian ideas in the early centuries of our era – such a book would certainly go far to fill the vacant place to which at the outset I referred; and might, in the guise of fiction, obtain a wide circulation and popular acceptance, doing thus a great service to the cause of historical truth.

He was not satisfied with the Elizabethan settlement, had great respect for the Church fathers, and was with difficulty induced to subscribe. The views of Archbishop Sandys on the Eucharist horrified him; but on the other hand he maintained friendly relations with Bishop Pilkington and Thomas Lever, and the Puritans had some hope of his support.

Death 

Bernard Gilpin died on 4 March 1583 in Durham Market-place when an ox and cart ran him over. His tomb is in Houghton-le-Spring Church. He is featured in stained glass in Liverpool's Anglican Cathedral.

George Carleton, Bishop of Chichester (1619–1628), was a pupil of Bernard Gilpin at the Royal Kepier Grammar School at Houghton-le-Spring. He published his Vita Bernardi Gilpini in 1628. This was published in English in 1638 as The Life of Bernard Gilpin along with the text of the Sermon preached before Edward VI in 1552. The Reverend C. S. Collingwood's Memoirs of Bernard Gilpin was published in 1884.

See also
 List of English and Welsh endowed schools (19th century)

References

External links
Bernard Gilpin Time Line
Bernard Gilpin Thorn
Bernard Gilpin's tomb
The Gilpin Family Crest
Houghton Feast

1517 births
1583 deaths
Alumni of The Queen's College, Oxford
Burials in Tyne and Wear
16th-century Anglican theologians
16th-century English theologians
16th-century English Anglican priests
Fellows of The Queen's College, Oxford
Fellows of Christ Church, Oxford
People from Kendal
Archdeacons of Durham